Stenorhynchus is a genus of marine crabs in the family Inachidae, containing the following species:
Stenorhynchus debilis (S. I. Smith, 1871)
Stenorhynchus lanceolatus (Brullé, 1837)
Stenorhynchus seticornis (J. F. W. Herbst, 1788) – yellowline arrow crab 
Stenorhynchus yangi Goeke, 1989 – red arrow crab

References

Majoidea
Taxa named by Jean-Baptiste Lamarck
Crustacean genera